Tebroke is a surname. Notable people with the surname include:

 Gerard Tebroke (1949–1995), Dutch runner 
 Hermann-Josef Tebroke (born 1964), German politician